FB-10 is a mobile light air defense missile system developed by China Aerospace Science and Industry Corporation for export market. Unveiled at the 2016 Zhuhai Airshow, it features a 6x6 TEL with a phased array radar, optical sensor, and eight missile tubes.

Variants
FB-10 original variant
FB-10A an improved variant

References

Surface-to-air missiles of the People's Republic of China